Connecticut's 30th State Senate district elects one member of the Connecticut State Senate. It consists of the towns of Brookfield, Canaan, Cornwall, Goshen, Kent, Litchfield, Morris, New Milford, North Canaan, Salisbury, Sharon, Winchester, Warren and part of Torrington. It has been represented by Republican Craig Miner since 2017.

List of Senators

Election results

2020

2018

2016

2014

2012

References

30